The following Confederate States Army units and commanders fought in the Battle of Peachtree Creek of the American Civil War. The Union order of battle is listed separately.

Abbreviations used

Military rank
 Gen = General
 LTG = Lieutenant General
 MG = Major General
 BG = Brigadier General
 Col = Colonel
 Ltc = Lieutenant Colonel
 Maj = Major
 Cpt = Captain
 Lt = Lieutenant

Other
 (w) = wounded
 (mw) = mortally wounded
 (k) = killed in action
 (c) = captured

Army of Tennessee
Gen John B. Hood

Stewart’s Corps
LTG Alexander P. Stewart
Escort
 Orleans Light Horse - Cpt Leeds Greenleaf

Hardee's Corps
LTG William J. Hardee

Other units

Sources
 Fortune City

External links
 The Confederate Forces Engaged
 The Federal Forces Engaged
 The Battle of Peachtree Creek Plaque 2 - Forces Engaged 

American Civil War orders of battle
Atlanta campaign